In Roman mythology, Moneta (Latin Monēta) was a title given to two separate goddesses: It was the name of the goddess of memory (identified with the Greek goddess Mnemosyne), and it was an epithet of Juno, called Juno Moneta (Latin Iūno Monēta). The latter's name is the source of numerous words in English and the Romance languages, including “money" and "mint".

The cult of the goddess Moneta was established largely under the influence of Greek religion, which featured the cult of Mnemosyne ("Μνημοσύνη"), the goddess of memory and the mother of the Muses. The goddess's name is derived from Latin monēre (which means to remind, warn, or instruct). She is mentioned in a fragment of Livius Andronicus' Latin Odyssey: Nam diva Monetas filia docuit ("since the divine daughter of Moneta has taught...", frg. 21 Büchner), which may be the equivalent of either Od. 8,480-1 or 488.

The epithet Moneta that was given to Juno, in contrast, is more likely to have derived from the Greek word "moneres" ("μονήρης"), meaning "alone”, or “unique". By the time Andronicus was writing, the folk etymology of monēre was widely accepted, and so he could plausibly transmute this epithet into a reference to separate goddess - the literary (though not the religious) counterpart of the Greek Mnemosyne.

Juno Moneta 

Juno Moneta, an epithet of Juno, was the protectress of funds, and, accordingly, money in ancient Rome was coined in her temple. The word "moneta" (from which the words "money" and "monetize" are derived) was used by writers such as Ovid, Martial, Juvenal, and Cicero. In several modern languages, including Russian and Italian, moneta (Spanish moneda) is the word for "coin".

Juno Moneta's name (like the name of the goddess Moneta) is derived either from the Latin monēre (since, as the protectress of funds, she "warned" of economic instability) or, more likely, from the Greek "moneres", meaning "alone” or “unique".

According to the Suda, a Byzantine encyclopedia (which uses the Greek names of the goddess), she was called Moneta (Μονήτα) because when the Romans needed money during the wars against Pyrrhus and Taranto, they prayed to Hera, and she replied to them that, if they would hold out against the enemies with justice, they would not go short of money. After the wars, the Romans honoured Hera Moneta (that is, advisor - invoking the Latin verb moneo, meaning to 'warn' or 'advise'), and, accordingly, decided to stamp the coinage in her temple.

Coinage
"Moneta" retained the meanings of "money" and "die" well into the Middle Ages and appeared often on minted coins. For example, the phrase moneta nova is regular on coins of the low countries and the rhineland in the fourteenth and fifteenth century, with the "nova", Latin for "new", not necessarily signifying a new type or variety of coin.

In culture 
Moneta is a central figure in John Keats' poem "The Fall of Hyperion: A Dream".

References 

 
 
 en.museicapitolini.org

Roman goddesses
Juno (mythology)